Viktor Dobrotvorskiy (born 4 July 1966 in Vinnytsia, Ukrainian SSR) is a Soviet-born Ukrainian sprint canoer who competed in the early 1990s. He won three bronze medals at the ICF Canoe Sprint World Championships with two in the C-2 10000 m (1990, 1993) and one in the C-4 1000 m (1993) events.

References

Living people
Soviet male canoeists
Ukrainian male canoeists
1966 births
Sportspeople from Vinnytsia
ICF Canoe Sprint World Championships medalists in Canadian
Vinnytsia State Pedagogical University alumni
Sportspeople from Vinnytsia Oblast